Kaliakra Kavarna Albena Cup  or Albena Cup is an annual summer international football tournament held in Albena, Bulgaria, since 2000. Sponsored is "Moto-Pphoe", PFL, Bulgarian Football Union, municipality of Kavarna and resort "Albena" at home. Media Partner of the event's newspaper "Topsport". Chief organizer Nikolay Zlatev, who is head of the "Sport" in resort "Albena" AD. Kaliakra Kavarna Albena Cup is a descendant of the traditional international tournament Albena MobilTel (2001-2003). It is held in January and February.

In the first edition of the tournament eight participating teams were divided into two groups of four teams. Played against each other, arguing the winners for first place, while others allocate places to 8th.

Finals

External links
 Albena Cup at Rec.Sport.Soccer Statistics Foundation.

Bulgarian football friendly trophies